Guéni is a departments of Logone Occidental Region in Chad.  Its chief town is Krim Krim .

Subdivisions 
The department of Guéni is divided into 4 sub-prefectures:

 Krim Krim
 Bao
 Bemangra
 Doguindi

Administration 
Prefects of Guéni

 October 9, 2008: Adam Adami Youssouf

References 

Departments of Chad